Sandra L. "Sandy" Jolly (born 1954) is a former businessperson and politician in Nova Scotia, Canada. She represented Dartmouth North in the Nova Scotia House of Assembly from 1988 to 1998 as a Liberal member.

Jolly was born in Kentville, Nova Scotia and was educated at Kings County Academy and Mount Saint Vincent University. She entered provincial politics in the 1988 election, defeating Progressive Consertvative cabinet minister Laird Stirling by 121 votes in the Dartmouth North riding. Jolly was re-elected in the 1993 election, defeating New Democrat Jerry Pye by 423 votes.

On June 11, 1993, Jolly was appointed to the Executive Council of Nova Scotia as Minister of Municipal Affairs. In June 1996, she was moved to Minister of Business and Consumer Services. Jolly was left out of cabinet when Russell MacLellan took over as premier in July 1997, and resigned as MLA in January 1998.

References 
 Entry from Canadian Who's Who

1954 births
Living people
Members of the Executive Council of Nova Scotia
Mount Saint Vincent University alumni
Nova Scotia Liberal Party MLAs
Businesspeople from Nova Scotia
People from Dartmouth, Nova Scotia
People from Kentville, Nova Scotia
Women MLAs in Nova Scotia
Women government ministers of Canada